is a video game character from the Metal Gear video game series created by Hideo Kojima and developed and published by Konami.

He was first introduced in the 1987 Metal Gear game as the commanding officer and father of the main character Solid Snake. He is later featured in the prequel games, starting with Metal Gear Solid 3: Snake Eater as a younger version of the character named , an American Special Forces Operator and decorated war hero. Political manipulations cause him to be disillusioned when facing his own mentor, and he gradually develops his own private mercenary company.

The concept of Naked Snake was an attempt to distance him from Solid Snake, despite both being physically similar through their characterizations. He has been voiced by Akio Ōtsuka in Japanese, and by David Hayter and Kiefer Sutherland in English in these games. Critical reception to Big Boss has been positive, due to his role as a villain and rivalry formed with his former subordinate. His younger persona has been praised as likeable, with critics generally enjoying the execution of his character development in the series designed to shape him into the villainous icon.

Appearances

In the MSX2 games
Big Boss is introduced in the original Metal Gear game as the Special Forces Unit FOXHOUND's leader and Solid Snake's commanding officer. He initially acts as a radio contact who provides Snake with information about mission objectives, as well as weapons and equipment. After Snake destroys the titular TX-55 Metal Gear weapon despite Big Boss's discouragement, Outer Heaven's militia leader confronts Snake near the base's escape route in a final battle only to be defeated.

Metal Gear 2: Solid Snake reveals that Big Boss has since taken control of a fortified nation in Central Asia known as Zanzibar Land and commissions the development of Metal Gear D. Solid Snake confronts Big Boss once again while escaping from Zanzibar Land's detention camp, with Snake incinerating Big Boss.

In the Metal Gear Solid series
Big Boss's presence figures prominently in the original Metal Gear Solid games where his DNA was used to create the genetically-altered clones as part of the secret "Les Enfants Terribles" government project (French for "The Terrible Children"): Solid Snake, Liquid Snake, and Solidus Snake.

Metal Gear Solid 3: Snake Eater
The prequel Metal Gear Solid 3: Snake Eater depicts a young incarnation of the character, under the codename Naked Snake, as a member of the CIA special forces unit FOX in 1964 that was founded by Zero. With Para-Medic and Sigint for additional support, he is sent on an assignment in the Soviet Union to thwart an uprising led by the sadistic Volgin, rescue key weapons researcher Nikolai Stepanovich Sokolov, destroy the Shagohod prototype, and kill The Boss, his mentor who defected to the Soviet Union, to avert a nuclear war. Over the course of his assignment, he encounters Major Ocelot multiple times, fights and defeats the Cobra Unit (consisting of The Pain, The Fear, The End, The Fury and The Sorrow). After the mission is completed and Snake kills The Boss, he learns that the defection was part of a mission to be carried out, and the government ordered his mentor's death to prevent war. According to EVA's debrief, the political motives behind the operation do not sit well with Snake, especially after he is awarded the Big Boss title for his actions which he initially rejects, prompting him to retire from active service.

Metal Gear Solid: Portable Ops
Metal Gear Solid: Portable Ops shows Naked Snake still under his former codename, believing that he has yet to surpass The Boss as a warrior. Having spent six years wandering the globe, Snake finds himself involved in an armed uprising caused by Gene's rogue FOX unit in the (fictional) San Hieronymo peninsula in Colombia and learns that he has been convicted for instigating the revolt. Hoping to clear his name, Snake forms his own team of specialists by recruiting both old allies and defecting enemy soldiers to his cause, one of whom happens to be Roy Campbell. He faces not only the members of the FOX unit, but also Metal Gear's first prototype. After he learned that The Boss's death had been planned all along, Snake defeats Gene and obtains the funds for Army's Heaven.

Metal Gear Solid 4: Guns of the Patriots
Metal Gear Solid 4: Guns of the Patriots revealed that Big Boss was one of the founding members of Zero's cause to initially realize The Boss's dream, but this spiraled into a conspiracy to impose order and control over the world after Big Boss disagreed with Zero's interpretation of the dream. Big Boss despised his role as figurehead, especially since Zero's vision placed no value on loyalty to ideals and people, something The Boss treasured above all else. When Big Boss learns that his own DNA was being used for Zero's "Les Enfants Terribles" project, this proved to be the final straw. After his defection from Zero's cause, Big Boss plotted coup d'état with Outer Heaven and Zanzibar Land. Although he had survived these defeats, he was placed in an artificially induced coma with his genetic code used for an ID recognition system, the use of which allows access to the AIs that make up the Patriots. His body is recovered and reconstructed using parts from the bodies of both Liquid and Solidus, and he awakens from his coma after the fall of the Patriots' AIs. Following the game's voice casting credits, Big Boss appears before Old Snake. After he reveals the truth, Big Boss shuts down the catatonic Zero's life support system. He manages to come to terms with his feelings regarding The Boss, and then reconciles with his son before dying from exposure to the new FOXDIE virus.

Metal Gear Solid: Peace Walker
Naked Snake's past again serves as the scenario in Metal Gear Solid: Peace Walker after he and his business partner Kazuhira "Kaz" Miller established the mercenary force Militaires Sans Frontières (French for "Soldiers Without Borders") made up of expatriate soldiers recruited to his cause. He intends to use MSF to live out The Boss's final will, a world where soldiers are free to choose their own fights on their own terms, and not at the whim of a government. On Colombia's Barranquilla coast, two apparent representatives of the Costa Rican government (Paz Ortega Andrade and Ramon Gálvez Mena) seek to hire MSF to liberate Costa Rica from Coldman's CIA Peace Sentinel unit that has established bases in the country. After Snake accepts the mission, the MSF takes over an offshore research platform in the Caribbean as their base of operations in a bid to expand the group's capabilities following Kaz's advice. Over the story's course, Snake comes to learn about the true purpose of Coldman's Peace Walker prototypes (Pupa, Chrysalis, Cocoon and Peace Walker) and gradually lets go of his guilt for The Boss's death after encountering an AI replica, finally accepting his Big Boss title. Later in the game, Big Boss has Huey Emmerich create Metal Gear ZEKE as a weapon to defend his interests, with no desire to use offensively. After Big Boss killed Gálvez out of self-defense, Paz pilots ZEKE to launch a nuclear strike on the Eastern Coast of the United States as part of an insurance policy if Big Boss refused to obey Cipher. After hearing the ultimatum, Big Boss refuses and fights ZEKE in order to stop Paz. He is victorious, but ZEKE is heavily damaged and Paz is ejected into the Caribbean Sea. After ZEKE's destruction, Kaz tells Big Boss of being aware of the plot from the beginning, and used it to spur MSF's growth. Big Boss and Kaz realize they'll no longer be able to be away from the outside world unless they reveal their true nature. Big Boss rejects this idea, stating that his "life shall be different from [The Boss's]". After this conversation, Big Boss gives a speech to the MSF soldiers, telling them that if the times demand it, they will be vigilantes, criminals and terrorists, but they will be the ones to choose their battles and their causes, not governments.

Metal Gear Solid V
Big Boss plays a central role in Metal Gear Solid V: Ground Zeroes and Metal Gear Solid V: The Phantom Pain. He is on a mission to rescue a child soldier and Pacifica Ocean from an American black site on Cuban soil; Big Boss believes that Pacifica can be converted to MSF's cause. His rescue is successful and the medic found a bomb implanted inside Pacifica who is sacrificed to save everyone from another bomb which causes an explosive concussion wave which causes the helicopter to crash into the Caribbean Sea as MSF is destroyed by the invading XOF paramilitary force led by Skull Face. Big Boss comes out of his coma and poses as "Ishmael", a patient in the hospital where Venom Snake is being treated. He aids in an escape when the hospital is attacked by Skull Face's forces. While his mental doppelganger ventures into Soviet-controlled Afghanistan using the new mercenary force Diamond Dogs made from MSF's remaining forces, Big Boss stays behind the scenes to develop the true version of Outer Heaven.

Other appearances
In Snake's Revenge, a non-canonical sequel to the original Metal Gear for the NES released during the same year as Metal Gear 2: Solid Snake, Big Boss returns as the leader of the enemy organization, having survived the injuries he sustained in the original game as a cyborg. He fights Solid Snake as a boss prior to reaching the new Metal Gear prototype and has two forms: his human form and a fire-breathing cyborg form. Naked Snake also appears as a playable character in Super Bomberman R.

Creation and design
In Metal Gear 2: Solid Snake, Big Boss' visual appearance was inspired by actor Sean Connery. However, for the ports of the game's re-released version, the original design was replaced by Yoji Shinkawa's design.

During the making of Metal Gear Solid 3: Snake Eater, Hideo Kojima asked Shinkawa to make Naked Snake similar to Solid Snake, but with the differences that unlike Solid Snake, Naked Snake was a rookie and thus acted more naive. Shinkawa stated having no difficulties in designing Naked Snake as basically a revised version of Solid Snake. As a result, Naked Snake is virtually identical to Solid Snake from the previous Metal Gear Solid games in terms of appearance. The love scene between Naked Snake and EVA was inspired by the first Pink Panther. Kojima and Shinkawa watched the movie but the former stated it might have come different from the original version. Since the game's trailers did not state that Naked Snake was Big Boss, Kojima often gave vague answers to the character's true identity. Although the ending of Metal Gear Solid 3 reveals Naked Snake was given the Big Boss title, Kojima stated "he's not really the Big Boss yet". With Metal Gear Solid: Peace Walker, he wanted to explain how Naked Snake became the man who appeared in the original Metal Gear games as Solid Snake's enemy.

Naked Snake as portrayed in Metal Gear Solid 3 shares the same voice actor as Solid Snake did in the first two Metal Gear Solid games, being voiced by Akio Otsuka in the Japanese version and David Hayter in the English version. Both actors would return to provide Snake's voice in Portable Ops and Peace Walker. The elderly version of Big Boss who appears in the end of Metal Gear Solid 4 is voiced by Chikao Otsuka (Akio Otsuka's real-life father) in Japanese and by Richard Doyle in English. Originally, Naked Snake was planned to have been voiced by Kurt Russell due to Kojima's request but the actor refused.

On June 6, 2013, during Konami's third annual pre-E3 show, it was announced that Kiefer Sutherland would be portraying Snake in Metal Gear Solid V, replacing David Hayter (Akio Otsuka was unaffected by this casting change and continued to portrayed Snake in the Japanese dub). Sutherland plays the original Big Boss (who serves as the playable character in the stand-alone prologue Ground Zeroes), as well as Venom Snake (a new version of the character who serves as the protagonist in the main game The Phantom Pain). In addition to the voice, Sutherland also provided facial capture for the character. Sutherland was assigned the role after a suggestion to Kojima from Hollywood producer and director Avi Arad; Kojima's reason was to "have a more subdued performance expressed through subtle facial movements and tone of voice rather than words", and that he "needed someone who could genuinely convey both the facial and vocal qualities of a man in his late 40s".

Reception
Big Boss' character has been well-received, with IGN ranking him number 32 on their 2010 list of top video game villains, and as the fourth top Metal Gear villains. In 2010, IGN'''s Jesse Schedeen found the character one of the most important characters from the franchise to the point his "influence is felt in every Metal Gear game, even if he isn't always present in the flesh". Ken Gagne of Computerworld named Big Boss as one of the most creative "badass villains" in video games, citing the complexity of his betrayal of Solid Snake, fueled by Solid Snake being his genetic heir. Additionally, Joe Dodson of GameSpot listed Big Boss as one of the 20 best Metal Gear bosses with focus on his importance within the series' plot. He was ranked as the 28th "coolest" video game villain by Complex in 2012. Naked Snake's transition to Big Boss was listed as the second hero who turned evil by What Culture with the writer finding the character more interesting than Solid Snake based on his progression across Big Boss' video games. Various gaming sites such as 1UP.com, Game Informer and Kotaku placed his character as one of the worst fathers in video games due to his poor relationship with Solid Snake and the attempts to murder his own son.

The inclusion of Naked Snake's role in Metal Gear Solid 3 has also received praise from critics. Prior to the game's release, Naked Snake was often called 'Solid Snake' or simply 'Snake' by critics due to his resemblance with Solid Snake, although some still were not sure about his true identity. Additionally, early speculation of the playable character's identity from Metal Gear Solid 3: Snake Eater was listed by IGN as one top ten rumors on the PlayStation 2. Benjamin Turner of GameSpy further noted that various fans started making theories about Naked Snake's identity before the game's release as while they thought it was Solid Snake, the setting from the game made it impossible for Solid Snake to be the game's main protagonist due to their difference of years. Finding the revelation of Naked Snake's identity was considered by GameSpy as "the single coolest thing Kojima could have done in MGS3" because of [Naked Snake's] differences from [Solid Snake] in regards to their personality as well as because it made fans wonder how Naked Snake would become the series antagonist Big Boss. Another comparison between Big Boss' and Solid Snake's character was made by IGN's Phil Pirrello in article titled "Stars Thunderdome: Snake vs. Big Boss." Despite the similarities between Naked Snake and Solid Snake, Rich Stanton of Eurogamer praised how different is they are from each other in terms of experience within the battlefield but also liked how Naked looks after the Boss despite the game placing them as enemies. Dave Meikleham of GamesRadar placed his relationship with EVA in his top list of disastrous game romances due to how it was ruined by the two's different roles in the story. Play editor Nick Jones listed Naked Snake's final fight against The Boss in such game as the second best moment from the franchise, citing the emotional focus from their characters. David Hayter's performance as Naked Snake's English voice actor in Metal Gear Solid 3 has been criticized by Edge while discussing the dialogues from the game.

Joe Dodson, writing for GameRevolution, disliked Big Boss' character in Portable Ops due to his process of kidnapping and indoctrinating enemy soldiers through "confusing rants" about the idea of loyalty. Rob Fahey of Eurogamer found that Snake remained likeable from carrying over traits shown in Snake Eater and praised Hayter's performance. Charles Herold of The New York Times described Snake as a tragic character based on the events shown in Snake Eater, and with Portable Ops had been forced to face a new conflict despite retirement. Greg Kasavin of GameSpot praised the handling of Snake's character in Portable Ops due to his interactions with his former partners from the FOX unit. Jeff Haynes of IGN noted how the game presented major plot twists and exposition that would affect Snake's characterization and lay the groundwork for important items shown later in the series.

Oli Welsh of Eurogamer criticized Big Boss' characterization in Peace Walker as confusing in the wider context of the series, with mixed comments being given to Hayter's performance. Jonathan Holmes of Destructoid enjoyed how Peace Walker further developed Big Boss' character from Portable Ops by completing his journey from lone soldier to leader and cementing him as the icon he would become. Greg Miller of IGN also found the game's story was one of the most enjoyable and least-convoluted by focusing purely on Big Boss' emotions and his quest to discover more about his fallen mentor, The Boss, similar sentiments of which were shared by Ramón Varela of Vandal and Randy Nelson of Engadget. Jason Schreier of Kotaku disliked the plot twist in The Phantom Pain'' which revealed that the player character, Venom Snake, was not Big Boss, feeling it cheapened the emotional crux of the story and that it failed to explain Big Boss' motivations for becoming a villain.

References

Notes

Footnotes 

Characters designed by Yoji Shinkawa
Cryonically preserved characters in video games
Fictional American people in video games
Fictional characters missing an eye
Fictional characters with post-traumatic stress disorder
Fictional assassins in video games
Fictional Central Intelligence Agency personnel
Fictional contract killers
Fictional criminals in video games
Fictional cult leaders
Fictional guerrillas
Fictional gunfighters in video games
Fictional judoka
Fictional jujutsuka
Fictional karateka
Fictional Korean War veterans
Fictional male martial artists
Fictional marksmen and snipers
Fictional martial arts trainers
Fictional martial artists in video games
Fictional members of secret societies
Fictional mercenaries in video games
Fictional military personnel in video games
Fictional military spies
Fictional private military members
Fictional revolutionaries
Fictional secret agents and spies in video games
Fictional terrorists
Fictional knife-fighters
Fictional spymasters
Fictional military strategists
Fictional commanders
Fictional soldiers in video games
Fictional torturers and interrogators
Fictional United States Army Special Forces personnel
Fictional Vietnam War veterans
Fictional war criminals
Fictional warlords in video games
Fictional anarchists
Politician characters in video games
Konami antagonists
Konami protagonists
Male characters in video games
Male video game villains
Metal Gear characters
Video game bosses
Video game characters introduced in 1987